Olszewo-Borki  is a village in Ostrołęka County, Masovian Voivodeship, in east-central Poland. It is the seat of the gmina (administrative district) called Gmina Olszewo-Borki.

The village has a population of 820.

References

Olszewo-Borki